Staring at the Divine is the fourth studio album by American heavy metal band Alabama Thunderpussy. It was released in 2002.

Reception

Eduardo Rivadavia of AllMusic praised the album's "immense, memorable riffs" and wrote that it had more cohesiveness and focus than the band's prior album.

Track listing
 "Ol' Unfaithful" - 4:16
 "Motor Ready" - 4:21
 "Shapeshifter" - 4:12
 "Whore Adore" - 4:39
 "Hunting By Echo" - 4:34
 "Beck and Call" - 3:45
 "Twilight Arrival" - 6:44
 "Esteem Fiend" - 6:11
 "S.S.D.D." - 6:40
 "Amounts That Count" - 2:39

Personnel
 Johnny Throckmorton - vocals
 Erik Larson - guitar
 Ryan Lake - guitar
 Sam Krivanec - bass
 Bryan Cox - drums

References

2002 albums
Alabama Thunderpussy albums